The High Desert Mavericks were an American Minor League Baseball team in Adelanto, California, that played their home games at Heritage Field at Stater Bros. Stadium. They played in the Class A-Advanced California League. The franchise had eight different major league affiliations over its 29 seasons.

History
The franchise was founded in 1988 and was first based in Riverside, California, and was known as the Red Wave, beginning in 1988. In 1991, the ballclub relocated north, near Hwy 395, to the city of Adelanto, part of the Victor Valley metro area in California's High Desert region.

The Mavericks played their home baseball games at Heritage Field at Stater Bros. Stadium (known as Stater Bros. Stadium from 2007 to 2014 and Mavericks Stadium until 2007) which opened in 1991 and seats 3,808 fans. The ballpark, next to Hwy 395, is known to be an extreme hitter-friendly venue which tended to inflate home run totals drastically. As a result, offensive statistics for High Desert players were discounted for comparative purposes, while the reverse was the case for statistics accumulated by High Desert pitchers.

On November 29, 2010, High Desert Mavericks were sold to Main Street Baseball after more than a year on the open market. Rumors had the team possibly relocating to Chico, California, if a new proposed ballpark had been built there. Although it was later reported on August 12, 2012, the Mavericks would be staying in the High Desert through the 2015 season and possibly through 2018.

In January 2016, the Adelanto City Council voided the team's lease at Heritage Field. The Mavericks were able to continue for the 2016 season at Heritage Field. However, on August 22, 2016, the California League announced the Mavericks would not return for the 2017 season and would cease operations. 

Before the California League announced the Mavericks would not return, rumors had the Mavericks relocating and joining the Carolina League in Kinston, North Carolina, while keeping the Rangers affiliation. However, Minor League Baseball also announced on August 22 that two expansion teams would join the Carolina League in 2017 with the new Kinston team taking over the Rangers affiliation at the A-Advanced level from the Mavericks.

In their final game, the High Desert Mavericks defeated the Visalia Rawhide 7–4 on September 17, 2016, to capture the California League championship.

The final championship completed a bookend for the Mavericks who won the title in 1991, their first year of existence, and in 2016, their final year of existence.

The Mavericks' Luke Tendler hit the final California League home run in Heritage Field at Stater Bros. Stadium and the Mavericks history with a solo home run shot in the bottom of the 8th inning.

In March 2019, the city and the Mavericks' owners settled a lawsuit brought by the owners over the city's 2016 attempt to void the stadium lease, with the city paying $3.8 million to the team owners.

Achievements
 The Mavericks are the only team in California League history to win championships in the years that their major league parent clubs also came into existence.
 The Mavericks were the first team in California League history to have cheerleaders. The Maverick Girls would perform dance numbers on top of the dugouts in between innings.
 On June 28, 2009, the Mavericks performed two historic feats on one day. They combined with the Lake Elsinore Storm to set a California League record for combined runs scored (51) in a 33–18 loss, and outfielder James McOwen broke the California League record for longest hitting streak, hitting safely for the 36th straight game.

Notable High Desert Mavericks alumni

 Rod Barajas
 Nick Bierbrodt
 Bruce Bochy (inaugural manager)
 Craig Breslow
 Billy Butler
 Howie Clark
 Jack Cust
 Greg Halman
 Robby Hammock
 J. J. Hardy
 Corey Hart
 J. P. Howell
 Shawn Kelley
 Travis Lee
 Cory Lidle
 Javier López
 Matt Mangini
 Matt Mieske
 Erick Monzón
 Jay Gainer
 Carl Everett
 Robert Person
 Brad Nelson
 Vicente Padilla
 Brad Penny
 Michael Pineda
 Stephen C. Reich
 Michael Saunders
 Junior Spivey
 Matt Vasgersian (MLB Network Announcer, was the Mavericks first radio announcer 1991)
 Don Wakamatsu (managed Mavs in 1998, was California League Manager of the Year that year; first Asian-American MLB manager)
 Howard Johnson (as manager)
 Brandon Weeden

References

External links
High Desert Mavericks Official Site

Baseball teams established in 1988
Baseball teams disestablished in 2016
1988 establishments in California
2016 disestablishments in California
Sports in the Inland Empire
Kansas City Royals minor league affiliates
Milwaukee Brewers minor league affiliates
Arizona Diamondbacks minor league affiliates
Miami Marlins minor league affiliates
San Diego Padres minor league affiliates
Baltimore Orioles minor league affiliates
Seattle Mariners minor league affiliates
Texas Rangers minor league affiliates
Defunct California League teams
Professional baseball teams in California
Defunct baseball teams in California